Aziz "Boutahar" Jahjah (Arabic: زيز جهجه; born April 25, 1980) is a Belgian-Moroccan heavyweight kickboxer, fighting out of Golden Glory Gym in Breda, Netherlands. He is former WFCA Muay Thai World champion, currently fighting in K-1

Biography and career

Titles

 2004 Grand Tournoi de Kickboxing tournament champion
 2003 WFCA Thaiboxing Heavyweight World title
 2002 WFCA Thaiboxing -82 kg World title

Professional kickboxing record

|-
|-  style="background:#fbb;"
| 2009-06-27 || Loss ||align=left| Brian Douwes || Ring Sensation RS1 Tournament || Rozenburg, Netherlands || Decision (unanimous) || 3 || 3:00
|-  style="background:#cfc;"
| 2009-01-24 || Win ||align=left| Goran Radonjić || Beast of the east || Zutphen, Netherlands || Decision (Unanimous) || 3 || 3:00
|-  style="background:#fbb;"
| 2008-08-09 || Loss ||align=left| Paul Slowinski || K-1 World GP 2008 in Hawaii || Hawaii || KO (Punches) || 3 || 1:53
|-  style="background:#cfc;"
| 2008-05-31 || Win ||align=left| Łukasz Jarosz || Beast of the east || Zutphen, Netherlands || TKO (Referee stoppage)  || 1 || 
|-  style="background:#fbb;"
| 2008-01-12 || Loss ||align=left| Nikola Dimkovski || Lord Of The Rings || Belgrade, Serbia || KO || 3 || 
|-  style="background:#cfc;"
| 2007-12-05 || Win ||align=left| Errol Turgut || Marokko VS Turkije ||  || KO  ||  ||
|-  style="background:#cfc;"
| 2007-07-04 || Win ||align=left| Björn Bregy || Balans Fight Night || Netherlands || TKO (Doctor stoppage)  ||  || 
|-  style="background:#cfc;"
| 2006-12-09 || Win ||align=left| Peter Mulder || Judgement Day || Roosendaal, Netherlands || KO  || 2 || 
|-  style="background:#fbb;"
| 2006-11-04 || Loss ||align=left| Mourad Bouzidi || MSN Fightgala @ Delfzijl || Delfzijl, Netherlands || Decision (Unanimous) || 5 || 3:00
|-  style="background:#cfc;"
| 2006 || Win ||align=left| Wanlop Sitpholek ||  ||  || KO  || 1 ||
|-  style="background:#fbb;"
| 2006-02-04 || Loss ||align=left| Samir Benazzouz || WFCA ||  || KO  || 2 ||
|-  style="background:#cfc;"
| 2005-11-19 || Win ||align=left| Frédéric Sinistra || Westpoint Fight Night ||  || TKO  ||  || 
|-  style="background:#fbb;"
| 2005-07-02 || Loss ||align=left| Ivan Strugar || Le Grand Tournoi 2005, quarter finals || Paris, France || Decision || 3 || 3:00
|-  style="background:#cfc;"
| 2005-03-19 || Win ||align=left| Orlando Breinburg || Gentlemen Fight Night ||  || KO  || 2 || 
|-  style="background:#cfc;"
| 2004-06-05 || Win ||align=left| Frédérique Bellonie || La Finale Du Grand Tournoi, final || Paris, France || KO  || 2 || 
|-
! style=background:white colspan=9 |
|- 
|-  style="background:#cfc;"
| 2004-06-05 || Win ||align=left| Ivan Strugar || La Finale Du Grand Tournoi, semi finals || Paris, France || Decision  || 3 || 3:00
|-  style="background:#cfc;"
| 2004-06-05 || Win ||align=left| Alfredo Limonta || La Finale Du Grand Tournoi, quarter finals || Paris, France || KO  || 1 || 
|-

See also
List of male kickboxers
List of K-1 Events
Indochinese kickboxing

External links
Golden Glory Gym

References

Belgian male kickboxers
Moroccan male kickboxers
Heavyweight kickboxers
Belgian Muay Thai practitioners
Moroccan Muay Thai practitioners
Belgian sportspeople of Moroccan descent
Belgian expatriates in the Netherlands
1980 births
Living people